Dora's Peace is a 2016 South African crime drama directed by Konstandino Kalarytis and starring Khabonina Qubeka, Danny Keogh, Hlubi Mboya, Ronnie Nyakale and Paballo Koza.

Cast
Denel Honeyball as Kelly
Danny Keogh as Stavro
Paballo Koza as Peace
Yule Masiteng as Father Khumalo
Israel Makoe as Shakes
Hlubi Mboya as Connie
Tinah Mnumzana	as Dora's mom
Molefi Monaisa	as Themba
Ronnie Nyakale as Vusi
Khabonina Qubeka as Dora
Meren Reddy as Ravi

Reception
Theresa Smith of Independent Online awarded the film four stars out of five.

Accolades and nominations
The film was nominated for five Africa Movie Academy Awards, including Best Achievement in Sound, Best Actress in a Leading Role (Khabonina Qubeka), Best Young Actor (Paballo Koza), Best Makeup and Best Screenplay.

At the Boston International Film Festival, Qubeka won the Indie Spirit Award for Best Actress and director Konstandino Kalarytis won a Special Recognition Award.

For her performance, Hlubi Mboya won the South African Film and Television Award for Best Supporting Actress in a Feature Film.  Nerine Pienaar and Jolandi Pienaar were also nominated for the SAFTA Award for Best Achievement in Costume Design – Feature Film.

The film also won the Best South African Feature Film award at the Jozi Film Festival and was nominated for the Rapid Lion Award for Best South African Film.

References

External links
 
 

South African action films
South African crime films
South African drama films
English-language South African films
2010s English-language films